Powys, is a Welsh surname. Notable people with the surname include:

Albert Powys (1881–1936), British architect and Secretary of the Society for the Protection of Ancient Buildings
Arthur Powys (1842–1875), New Zealand cricketer
Betsan Powys (born 1965), Welsh journalist and former Editor of Programmes for BBC Radio Cymru
Caroline Girle Powys (1736–1817), British diarist
Eiludd Powys, early 7th-century King of Powys
Frederick Powys (1808–1863), English cricketer
George Powys, 7th Baron Lilford (1931–2005), British businessman
Horatio Powys (1805–1877), priest in the Church of England and Bishop of Sodor and Man
John Cowper Powys (1872–1963), English philosopher, lecturer, novelist, critic and poet
John Powys, 5th Baron Lilford (1863–1945), British peer and cricketer
Littleton Powys (1647–1732), a Justice of the King's Bench
Littleton Powys (cricketer) (1771–1842), English cricketer
Llewelyn Powys (1884–1939), British novelist and essayist
Mark Powys, 8th Baron Lilford (born 1975)
Philippa Powys (1886–1963), British novelist and poet
Richard Powys (1844–1913), English cricketer
Stephen Powys, 6th Baron Lilford (1869–1949), British peer
T. F. Powys (1875–1953), British writer
Thomas Powys (judge) (1649–1719), English lawyer, judge and Tory politician
Thomas Powys (priest) (1747–1809), Anglican clergyman
Thomas Powys, 1st Baron Lilford (1743–1800), British politician
Thomas Powys, 2nd Baron Lilford (1775–1825), British peer
Thomas Powys, 3rd Baron Lilford (1801–1861), British peer and Whig politician
Thomas Powys, 4th Baron Lilford (1833–1896), British aristocrat and ornithologist
Walter Powys (1849–1892), English first-class cricketer

See also
Powis (disambiguation), including a list of people with the surname

Surnames of Welsh origin